The Silence is a British television crime drama, first broadcast on BBC One in 2010, which follows the story of a young deaf girl who witnesses a murder. The series was broadcast between 12–15 July 2010. The drama stars deaf actress Genevieve Barr in her first major role following her successful screen debut in Channel 4's The Amazing Dermot, alongside Dervla Kirwan, Gina McKee, Hugh Bonneville and Douglas Henshall. The series was also directed by Dearbhla Walsh. The series, produced by Company Pictures, was filmed in Dublin, but set in Bristol.

Plot
The Silence is set in and around Bristol, south-western England. The plot centres around Amelia, portrayed by Genevieve Barr, an eighteen-year-old struggling to integrate into a hearing world following cochlear implantation, who witnesses the murder of a police officer. The subsequent investigation unravels a net of police corruption.

DCI Jim Edwards (Henshall) is investigating a gang execution. His wife Maggie (Kirwan) invites Amelia, his niece, to stay with their family for respite and to help her to hear using her recent implant. Amelia has overprotective parents, Anne and Chris (McKee and Bonneville), and relishes the chance to party with her cousins Tom, Joel and Sophie (Ferrier, Kane and Oldfield). While there, Amelia witnesses the murder of Jane Shilladay (O'Grady), a policewoman who works for the domestic violence unit and is romantically involved with colleague and amateur boxer Rocky (Campbell). By lip-reading CCTV footage, Amelia provides Edwards with a link between the two apparently unrelated murders, and recognises a member of the drug squad as one of the killers. He keeps her evidence and identity a secret in order to protect her, putting his career at risk, but their lives become endangered when he begins to unravel police corruption within the drug squad.

The Edwards family becomes victimised by the drugs squad, with Jim Edwards' wife Maggie (Kirwan) being harassed by policeman Mac (Hallett), and son Tom being framed, by Mac and Rocky, for conspiracy to deal drugs along with Ely (Nevern), Sophie's boyfriend.

Cast
Genevieve Barr — Amelia Edwards
Gina McKee — Anne Edwards
Hugh Bonneville — Chris Edwards
Douglas Henshall — DCI Jim Edwards
Dervla Kirwan — Maggie Edwards
Harry Ferrier — Tom Edwards
Tom Kane — Joel Edwards
Rebecca Oldfield — Sophie Edwards
Rod Hallet — DCI Peter MacKinnon
Mark Stobbart — DI Lee Grigson
Richie Campbell — DS Rocky Smith
Del Synnott — DI Terry Johns
David Westhead — Superintendent Frank Evans
Eimear O'Grady — Jane Shilladay
Jody Latham — Gary Roach
Laura Way — Robyn Seabold
Nick Nevern — Ely
Shazad Latif — Yousef
Rebecca Dunne — Issy
Catriona Martin — Paula
Lara Steward — Maxine
Emmet Kirwan — Custody Officer

References

External links

BBC television dramas
Television shows set in Bristol
2010s British drama television series
2010 British television series debuts
2010 British television series endings
Television series by All3Media
2010s British crime drama television series
Television shows about deaf people